Mitchell Downtown Historic District is a national historic district located at Mitchell, Lawrence County, Indiana.

The district encompasses 75 contributing buildings in the central business district and surrounding residential sections of Mitchell.  It developed between about 1853 and 1946, and includes examples of Italianate, Romanesque Revival, and Queen Anne style architecture.  Located in the district is the separately listed Mitchell Opera House.  Other notable buildings include the First National Bank Building (1927), Odd Fellows Hall (c. 1925), Jacob Finger Methodist Church (1874, 1925), Dr. William Dings House (c. 1885), Edward Moore House (1894), Bank of Mitchell Building (1897), Fannie Moore Richardson House (1910), Mitchell Public (Carnegie) Library (1917) and Theatorium (c. 1910).

It also includes a marker for the birthplace of astronaut Virgil Grissom on Eighth Street.

It was listed in the National Register of Historic Places in 1997.

References

Historic districts on the National Register of Historic Places in Indiana
Queen Anne architecture in Indiana
Romanesque Revival architecture in Indiana
Italianate architecture in Indiana
Historic districts in Lawrence County, Indiana
National Register of Historic Places in Lawrence County, Indiana